WDR Computerclub was the first television broadcast in West Germany of the Westdeutscher Rundfunk (WDR) that dealt solely with the issues of computer and technology.

The program had its focus on entertainment and information and the viewing public could also participate. During the show, curious and selfmade projects were presented. In the early days the show focused more on home computers, later the IBM PC and other personal computer moved closer to the center. Reference books were presented regurlary.

The show received generally positive reviews. After 22 years and 400 shows, it was cancelled being the oldest and most well-known show for computer and technology in German television. Various online petitions to preserve the show were started by a number of viewers. The last show was broadcast on 22 February 2003 on WDR.

See also
 German television
 Computer Chronicles
 
 WDR paper computer
 WDR 1-bit computer

References

External links

 WDR's official website

Westdeutscher Rundfunk
1981 German television series debuts
2003 German television series endings
1980s German television series
1990s German television series
2000s German television series
German-language television shows
Das Erste original programming